Lily Elise (born February 20, 1991) is a singer, songwriter from Berkeley, California. Elise has worked with artists such as Dillon Francis, Twin Shadow, Felix Cartal, Audra Mae, Gigi Radics, Markus Feehily and Hayden Panettiere. On November 4, 2014, she released the lead single "Generator," from her debut EP Taken.

Career 
Lily Elise is an alumna of the San Rafael, California based a cappella group, Til Dawn. Elise was a member of Team Christina in the first season on the America television vocal talent show The Voice.

In 2012, Elise co-wrote "Vadonatúj érzés" aka "Daydream" for Hungarian singer and winner of season six of the Hungarian music show, Megasztár Gigi Radics. The song, released on November 26, 2012, reached number one on the Mahasz Rádiós Top 40 radio airplay chart, remaining at number 1 for ten weeks. Two years later, in April 2014, Elise had her own release with a song she co-wrote and featured on for Canadian electronic music producer and DJ Felix Cartal's single "Let It Go" off his Credits EP, released on April 29, 2014 via Steve Aoki’s imprint, Dim Mak Records. On October 27, 2014, moobahton producer and DJ Dillon Francis released his debut album "Money Sucks, Friends Rule" on Columbia Records, with Elise featured on "Hurricane", the 12th and final track on the record.

On November 4, 2014, Elise released the lead single "Generator," from her debut EP Taken which music blog, All Things Go declared a "stunning combination of pop and R&B that few can pull off." Following "Generator" Elise released the uptempo single "Suitcases", the second track off her "Taken" EP. During March 2015, Warner Bros. Records artist Twin Shadow released his third album, Eclipse featuring a duet with Elise on the song, "Alone". Later, in 2015, Elise released her third single and title track, "Taken" which premiered on Billboard.com with the statement "If you're into any kind of edgy pop, R&B, or even EDM, we've got a feeling you're going to dig this one."

Alongside, co-writer Audra Mae and producer, Scott Effman, Elise co-wrote the debut single, "What If It's You," for fictional character, Juliette Barnes, played by actress Hayden Panettiere, which aired during the fourth season of  ABC musical drama, Nashville in episodes 4-2. "'Til the Pain Outwears the Shame" and 4-7. "Can't Get Used to Losing You." The song was additionally featured on "The Music of Nashville: Season 4, Volume 1." In addition, Elise co-wrote "Find My Way" alongside Markus Feehily and producer, Lester Mendez. "Find My Way" is on the deluxe release of, former Westlife member, Feehily's debut solo album, "Fire."

References

Living people
American women pop singers
Musicians from Berkeley, California
American contemporary R&B singers
21st-century American women singers
1991 births
21st-century American singers
The Voice (franchise) contestants